Hotar, Hotaru or Hotarul may refer to the following rivers in Romania:

 Hotar River (Sulța), tributary of the Sulța (Trotuș basin) in Bacău County
 Hotaru, tributary of the Crizbav (Olt basin) in Brașov County
 Hotaru, tributary of the Bozom (Olt basin) in Brașov County
 Hotaru River (Slănic), tributary of the Slănic (Buzău basin) in Buzău County
 Hotar, tributary of the Botul (Mureș basin) in Harghita County
 Hotaru, tributary of the Olt near Maieruș, Brașov County
 Hotarul, a tributary of the Olt near Olteț, Brașov County
 Hotarul, tributary of the Cormoș (Olt basin) in Covasna County

See also 
 Izvorul cu Hotar River (disambiguation)